Frédéric Volle (born 4 February 1966 in Montpellier) is a French handball player. He competed in the 1992 Summer Olympics and in the 1996 Summer Olympics.

Career
In 1992, Volle was a member of the French handball team which won the bronze medal. He played all seven matches and scored 23 goals.

Four years later, Volle finished fourth with the French team in the 1996 Olympic tournament. He played seven games and scored numerous goals. He was the second highest scorer. Volle also has a silver from 1993 world Championship in Sweden, Stolkholm and in the 1995 world championship in Iceland Volle won the world cup against Croatia.

See also
List of handballers with 1000 or more international goals

External links

1966 births
Living people
French male handball players
Olympic handball players of France
Handball players at the 1992 Summer Olympics
Handball players at the 1996 Summer Olympics
Olympic bronze medalists for France
Olympic medalists in handball
Medalists at the 1992 Summer Olympics